The 1970 San Francisco Giants season was the Giants' 88th year in Major League Baseball, their 13th year in San Francisco since their move from New York following the 1957 season, and their 11th at Candlestick Park.  The Giants went 86–76, which was good for third place in the National League West, 16 games behind the NL Champion Cincinnati Reds.

Offseason 
 December 1, 1969: 1969 rule 5 draft
Mike Sadek was drafted by the Giants from the Minnesota Twins.
Hal Haydel was drafted from the Giants by the Minnesota Twins.

Regular season 
Clyde King was fired as manager on May 23 after the Giants dropped a 15-inning 17–16 game to the San Diego Padres, slipping them to a 19–23 record and mired in fourth place. The Giants elevated Charlie Fox, manager of their AAA Phoenix (Pacific Coast League) farm team, to manage the big club. The team responded with a double-header sweep of the Padres, 6–1 and 7–6. Fox brought the Giants to a third-place finish with a 67–53 record the rest of the way.

Season standings

Record vs. opponents

Opening Day starters 
Bobby Bonds
Dick Dietz
Tito Fuentes
Al Gallagher
Ken Henderson
Hal Lanier
Willie Mays
Willie McCovey
Gaylord Perry

Roster

Player stats

Batting

Starters by position 
Note: Pos = Position; G = Games played; AB = At bats; H = Hits; Avg. = Batting average; HR = Home runs; RBI = Runs batted in

Other batters 
Note: G = Games played; AB = At bats; H = Hits; Avg. = Batting average; HR = Home runs; RBI = Runs batted in

Pitching

Starting pitchers 
Note: G = Games pitched; IP = Innings pitched; W = Wins; L = Losses; ERA = Earned run average; SO = Strikeouts

Other pitchers 
Note: G = Games pitched; IP = Innings pitched; W = Wins; L = Losses; ERA = Earned run average; SO = Strikeouts

Relief pitchers 
Note: G = Games pitched; W = Wins; L = Losses; SV = Saves; ERA = Earned run average; SO = Strikeouts

Awards and honors 

All-Star Game

Farm system

References

External links
 1970 San Francisco Giants at Baseball Reference
 1970 San Francisco Giants at Baseball Almanac

San Francisco Giants seasons
San Francisco Giants season
San Fran